The Saskatoon Yellow Jackets were a baseball team which played in Saskatoon, Saskatchewan.  The team was a member of the Western Major Baseball League, a collegiate summer baseball league operating in the prairie provinces of Canada. The team joined the league in 2002, but struggled financially throughout its existence. In 2014, the team folded, having missed the playoffs for six straight seasons.

The Saskatoon Yellow Jackets last six seasons in existence featured zero winning seasons as they finished 15-25 in 2009, 12-29 in 2010, 14-28 in 2011, 20-26 in 2012, 18-26 in 2013, and 20-26 in 2014. All of these six seasons saw the Yellow Jackets finish third in the Central Division of the Western Canadian Baseball League.

References

Sport in Saskatoon
Baseball teams in Saskatchewan
2015 disestablishments in Saskatchewan
Baseball teams disestablished in 2015
Defunct sports teams in Saskatchewan